3,4-Dihydroxymandelic acid (DHMA, DOMA) is a metabolite of norepinephrine.

References

Phenolic human metabolites
Alpha hydroxy acids
Catechols
Acetic acids
Triols